Pratik Bachan (born 7 February 1986), best known by his stage name B Praak (formerly Prakky B), is an Indian singer,  music director,  composer and music producer associated with the Punjabi and Hindi music industry. He started his career as a music producer, and later debuted as a singer with the song Mann Bharrya.
He has won many awards including A National Film Award and 2 Filmfare Awards.

He is a frequent collaborator of lyricist Jaani, and has since entered into Hindi cinema in 2019 with two songs as singer in the films Kesari and Good Newwz starring Akshay Kumar, and as a guest composer in the satire Bala.

Life and music career
Praak was born as Pratik Bachan in Chandigarh. His father, Varinder Bachan, is a Punjabi music producer and composer.

He started his career as music director with name of "Prakky B".He produced music for a few songs but songs got no recognition. In 2012, he met lyricist Jaani and started collaborating with him under the name 'B Praak'. In 2013, they released their first song "Soch" sung by Harrdy Sandhu and composed by him. The song became a chartbuster and is considered best Punjabi song of year 2013.

In later years, he composed and produced music for numerous of tracks of singers like Jassie Gill, Harrdy Sandhu, Amrinder Gill, Gippy Grewal, Diljit Dosanjh, Ammy Virk etc. with lyrics by Jaani. He composed tracks such as "Taara", "Joker", "Na Ji Na", "Ik Saal", "Do You Know", "Supna", "Backbone", "Horn Blow" and many more.

He later debuted as singer in 2018 with the single Mann Bharrya. He also sang more songs such as "Bewafaai "," Mastaani" and composed tracks such as "Qismat", "Naah", "Kya Baat Ay", "Hath Chummne", "Guitar Sikhda" in same and following year. He also produced music for Qismat, a film inspired by his song of the same name, for the first time in his career with lyrics by Jaani.

Praak made his Hindi film debut in 2019, first as a singer with the song Teri Mitti from the Hindi film Kesari starring Akshay Kumar and Parineeti Chopra, written by Manoj Muntashir and composed by Arko Pravo Mukherjee, and months later as a composer with a recreation of his song Naah, titled Naah Goriye, which was featured on the soundtrack of the Ayushmann Khurrana-starrer Bala. During this time, he also crooned a promotional song featuring Kumar for his second song as a singer, Ali Ali, which was featured on the soundtrack of the film Blank and was again composed by Mukherjee, while next crooning a remake of the popular song O Saaki Saaki for Batla House, written and composed by Tanishk Bagchi, where he sang alongside Neha Kakkar and Tulsi Kumar, in his first multi-singer song. He next reunited with Kumar for the comedy-drama film Good Newwz, crooning the song Maana Dil, composed by Bagchi and written by Rashmi Virag. Additionally, he recorded a reprise version of the song Dilbara from the 2019 remake of the film Pati Patni Aur Woh, which was composed by Sachet–Parampara and written by Navi Ferozpurwala, and again in his duet with Sunidhi Chauhan for the song Bharat Salaam, which was written and composed by Mithoon, and featured on the Hindi version soundtrack of Hotel Mumbai.

In the same year he released "Pachtaoge" sung by Arijit Singh, composed by him and written by Jaani featuring Vicky Kaushal and Nora Fatehi in the Video making it his first Hindi music video collaboration. In the same year he released the song "Filhaal" featuring Akshay Kumar and Nupur Sanon in the video, sung and composed by Praak with lyrics by Jaani.

In the same year he sang his first Telugu song Suryudivo Chandrudivo, for the film Sarileru Neekevvaru featuring Mahesh Babu.

In 2020, he released tracks such as "Kuch Bhi Ho Jaye", "Besharam Bewaffa", "Kyon", and "Baras Baras", and he composed the songs for Ammy Virk's film "Sufna" with lyrics by Jaani. He also performed some of the songs.

In early 2021, he released the single "Mazaa", and later in the same year, "Baarish Ki Jaaye" fearuring Nawazuddin Siddiqui and Sunanda Sharma in the music video with lyrics by Jaani. Praak won the National Film Award for Best Male Playback Singer in 2021 for his rendition of "Teri Mitti" at the 67th National Film Awards.

In 2019 "Filhall" Song Starred Akshay Kumar was released and in 2021 "Filhall 2 Mohabbat" was released.

In July 2021, he released the sequel of "Filhaal", "Filhaal 2 Mohabbat".

In July 2021, he sang "Ranjha" for the film Shershaah that starred Sidharth Malhotra and Kiara Advani. The song was the 2nd most streamed song in 2021 on Spotify in India. Another song was released from film Shershaah named "Mann Bharrya 2.0" which was a recreation of B Praak's Single "Mann Bharrya", recreated by B Praak himself along with Jaani. The song was streamed more than 50 million times on Spotify.

In September 2021, a sequel to his much popular soundtrack of the film Qismat 2 was released in which he served as music director for all songs and composer for two songs with lyrics by Jaani. The soundtrack was well received by its audience.

In 2022, his first bollywood project as music director came in Akshay Kumar's Bachchan Pandey in which he sang two songs "Meri Jaan Meri Jaan", "Saare Boli Bewafa" with lyrics by Jaani.

Personal life
In 2019, he married Meera in Chandigarh.

In an interview with Rajeev Masand, he considered AR Rahman as his inspiration in music direction and also refers Pritam, Jatin–Lalit, Vishal–Shekhar, Shankar–Ehsaan–Loy as his favorite composers. Also in an interview with AajTak, he considered Hariharan,Surinder Kaur, Sardool Sikander, Arijit Singh, KK as his favorite singers

In 2021, he got the Golden Visa of UAE.

Singles

As singer and music director

As a music director

As a singer only

Soundtrack albums

As a music director

As a playback singer

Awards and nominations

References

External links 

 
 
 B Praak All Songs Lits [Vlcmuic]
 B Praak Latest All Songs

1986 births
Punjabi-language singers
Bhangra (music) musicians
Indian male singers
Living people
Musicians from Chandigarh
Best Male Playback Singer National Film Award winners